In Australia, Canada and New Zealand, a law broker is a professional that assists individuals who are searching for a lawyer.  A law broker will analyze an individual's case or legal issue and provide a customized referral to an appropriate lawyer. Some common factors that a law broker will consider are a lawyer's experience level, success rate, reputation, and quality of service. A law broker will often review legal publications, court decisions, and rely upon a network of legal contacts to provide an objective, customized referral to a client.

The person who coined the term "law broker" was an Australian solicitor Dr. Yuri Rapoport of Kohen Rapoport Group.  He started the world's first law broking firm "Prime Law Brokers" in 1996, which paved the way for the development of the private-sector legal referral industry in Australia, New Zealand and United Kingdom.

Fees 

In most circumstances, a law broker does not charge a fee to a client but rather obtains a referral fee from the lawyer.

In other countries

In North America, an equivalent service is provided by lawyer referral programs, which are usually operated by bar associations.

Region-specific legal occupations